Richard Olowaranti Mbu Isong (born 11 July 1987), professionally known as P2J is a Nigerian-British producer from London, England. He is best known for his work with the likes of Beyoncé, Wizkid, Stormzy, FKA Twigs, Burna Boy, Tems, Doja Cat & many more.

Career
P2J started to solidify his production career at age 14, when an instructor recommended he transfer to music courses. His career kickstarted in 2007 on the television show, Channel U under the name P2J Project with the grime song "Hands in the Air". He formerly produced songs under the name Pro2Jay, for the likes of Tiwa Savage, Krept and Konan and Lily Allen. In 2017, he produced the song "Covered in You" for Chris Brown's album Heartbreak on a Full Moon.

In 2019, he became one of the go-to afrobeats producers, working with artists such as Burna Boy, Wizkid, GoldLink, WSTRN, Doja Cat, Davido and more. His largest collaboration in 2019 was with Beyoncé on the soundtrack album The Lion King: The Gift producing 6 tracks, earning him a Grammy nomination for Best Pop Vocal Album. In 2020, he won his first Grammy award for Best Global Music Album, on Burna Boy's album Twice as Tall. P2J was the primary producer on Wizkid's album Made in Lagos, which was nominated for a Grammy and included the song "Essence". The song became the first Nigerian song in history to chart on the Billboard Hot 100 and the Billboard Global 200 in 2021, and a remix featuring Justin Bieber was later released.<ref
name="Billboard"></ref>

In 2022, he produced for FKA Twigs on the song "Jealousy" from her mixtape Caprisongs. He has also produced 5 songs on Young T & Bugsey's mixtape Truth Be Told and "Fallen Angel" on Ella Mai's latest album "Heart on my Sleeve".

Artistry
P2J spoke on his production style in interview saying, "Wizkid and I were on the same path in terms of musicality when we met, in terms of merging different genres together, like merging reggae with the Afro, R&B with the Afro. He's been trying to get towards that through Soundman Vol. 1. We just eased into it with Made in Lagos. If you listen to the album, there's like a specific bass line that I've done that's quite memorable." He also said that his goal to "infuse African music in anything I do. Whether it's African music like afro and R&B, afro and house, afro and pop, or afro and rap. I've always tried to infuse it in any way."

Production discography

2013
Nathan - Dark Room - Single
 00. "Dark Room"

2015
Krept and Konan - The Long Way Home
 07. "I Don't Know" (featuring Rebecca Garton) (produced with Crumz)
 17. "So Easy" (produced with Big Mike)

Tiwa Savage - R.E.D
 08. "Love Me Hard" (featuring 2face Idibia)
 17. "Bad" (featuring Wizkid)

2017
Stormzy - Gang Signs & Prayer
 02. "Bad Boys" (featuring Ghetts & J Hus) (produced with Fraser T. Smith, EY & Stormzy)

Tiwa Savage - Sugarcane
 02. "Get It Now"
 04. "Hold Me Down"

Star.One  - Okay (P2J Remix) - Single
 00. Okay (P2J Remix) (featuring Maleek Berry & Seyi Shay)

Gyyps - Killafornia
 08. "Workout"

Yungen - All Night - Single
 00. "All Night" (featuring Mr Eazi)

Reblah - Back to Glory
 04. "Wabamilo" (featuring P2J)

Chris Brown - Heartbreak on a Full Moon
 07. "Covered in You" (produced with Ayo & Keyz)

2018
Burna Boy - Outside
 03. "Koni Baje"
 11. "Devil in California"

Lily Allen - No Shame
 04. "Your Choice" (featuring Burna Boy)
 08. "Higher"

Rebecca Garton - The Intent 2: The Come Up (soundtrack)
 18. "Always"

Mario - Dancing Shadows
 04. "Mirror" (produced with Mario & Jake Gosling)

2019

KSI and Randolph - New Age
 09. "Pull Up" (KSI featuring Jme) (produced with Sammy SoSo)

GoldLink - Diaspora
 01. "//error" (produced with Ari PenSmith & GoldLink)
 02. "Joke Ting" (featuring Ari PenSmith) (produced with Ari PenSmith)
 03. "Maniac" (produced with OBR)
 05. "Zulu Screams" (featuring Maleek Berry and Bibi Bourelly)
 06. "More" (featuring Lola Rae)
 07. "Cokewhite" (featuring Pusha T) (produced with Fwdslxsh, McKenzie, MD$ & Momberger)
 09. "Yard" (featuring Haile of WSTRN)
 10. "Spanish Song" (featuring WaveIQ)
 11. "No Lie" (featuring WizKid) (produced with Ari PenSmith & Deats)

Beyoncé - The Lion King: The Gift
 06. "Don't Jealous Me" (Tekno, Lord Afrixana, Yemi Alade and Mr Eazi) (produced with Beyoncé & Dixie)
 08. "Ja Ara E" (Burna Boy) (produced with Beyoncé & Dixie)
 14. "Water" (Salatiel, Pharrell and Beyoncé) (produced with Beyoncé)
 15. "Brown Skin Girl" (Beyoncé, Saint Jhn and Wizkid featuring Blue Ivy Carter) (produced with Beyoncé & Dixie)
 17. "Keys to the Kingdom" (Tiwa Savage and Mr Eazi) (produced with Beyoncé, Northboi Oracle, GuiltyBeatz & Dixie)
 25. "Scar" (070 Shake and Jessie Reyez) (produced with Beyoncé, Tim Suby, Hamelin, Ari PenSmith, Dixie & Mike Dean)

Burna Boy - African Giant
 02. "Anybody"

Mark Ronson - Don't Leave Me Lonely (featuring Yebba)
 01. "Don't Leave Me Lonely" (featuring Yebba)

WSTRN - WSTRN Season, Vol. 2
 14. "Switch It Up" (produced with AoD & PRGRSHN)

Snoh Aalegra - Situationship - Single
 00. "Situationship"

Odunsi (The Engine) - Better Days / Wetin Dey - Single
 00. "Better Days" (featuring Wani)

Justine Skye - Bare With Me
 02. "Secrets"
 03. "Bulletproof"
 05. "When You're Ready"

Wretch 32 - 10/10 - Single
 00. "10/10" (featuring Giggs)

Krept and Konan - G Love - Single
 00. "G Love" (featuring Wizkid)

Doja Cat - Hot Pink
 08. "Addiction" (produced with Ari PenSmith)

Jaz Karis - Summer Stories
 03. "Bad Memories"
 03. "Come Around"
 04. "Owe You"
 06. "Unwritten Rules"

Davido - A Good Time
 07. "Get to You"

Skylar Stecker - Redemption
 03. Sleep On"

2020
Starboy - Soundman Vol. 1
 01. "Jam" (Wizkid featuring Chronixx)

Skip Marley - Slow Down (P2J Remix) - Single
 00. "Slow Down (P2J Remix)" (featuring H.E.R.)

Manny Norté - 4AM - Single
 00. "4AM" (with 6lack, Rema & Tion Wayne)

Lilah - Atlantis
 01. "Atlantis"
 03. "Summer Nights Fling"
 04. "Oxymoron"
 05. "Tired"
 06. "Euphoria"
 07. "Lilah's Lullaby"

Wretch 32 - Upon Reflection 
 04. "10/10" (featuring Giggs)
 05. "Burn" (featuring Ghetts & Talay Riley)

Young T & Bugsey - Plead the 5th
 06. "Stand Up Man"

Haley Cassidy -  Stripped
 03. "Beyond the Sun"
 04. "Foolish"
 07. "Life After You"
 09. "So Gone (Interlude)"
 10. "Still Stay" (featuring Tiggs Da Author)
 11. "Why Didn't You Call?"

Aminé -  Limbo
 10. "Easy" (featuring Summer Walker)

Burna Boy - Twice as Tall
 02. "Alarm Clock" (produced with Diddy & Timbaland)

Tiwa Savage - Celia
 08. "Us (Interlude)"

Alicia Keys - Alicia
 04. "Wasted Energy" (featuring Diamond Platnumz)

Gorillaz - Song Machine, Season One: Strange Timez
 07. "Aries" (featuring Peter Hook and Georgia)
 12. "Opium" (featuring EarthGang)

Wizkid - Made in Lagos
 01. "Reckless"
 02. "Ginger" (featuring Burna Boy) (produced with Kel-P)
 03. "Longtime" (featuring Skepta) (produced with Sarz)
 04. "Mighty Wine"
 05. "Blessed" (featuring Damian Marley)	
 06. "Smile" (featuring H.E.R.)	
 07. "Piece of Me" (featuring Ella Mai)	
 08. "No Stress"
 10. "Sweet One"
 11. "Essence" (featuring Tems) (produced with Legendury Beatz)
 14. "Grace"
 16. "Mood" (featuring Buju)	
 17. "Steady"
 18. "Essence (Remix)" (featuring Justin Bieber & Tems)

Griff - Say It Again - Single
 01. "Say It Again"

Jessie Reyez - Before Love Came To Kill Us
 09. "ROOF"

Angel - Blessings (Remix)
 01. "Blessings Remix" (featuring French Montana & Davido)

2021
Dave - Titanium & Mercury - Single
 01. "Titanium"

Sinéad Harnett - Ready Is Always Too Late
 05. "Anymore" (featuring Lucky Daye)

Snoh Aalegra - Temporary Highs in the Violet Skies
 14. "Dying 4 Your Love" (produced with Marco Bernadis, Malik Venner & Jack Nichols-Marcy)

Dave - We're All Alone in This Together
 06. "System" (featuring Wizkid) (produced with Kyle Evans, Jae5 & Joe Reeves)
 07. "Lazarus" (featuring Boj) (produced with Jae5 & Joe Reeves)
 10. "Twenty to One" (produced with Dave & Kyle Evans)

Not3s - 3 Th3 Album
 08. "Counting"

WSTRN - Wonder Woman - Single
 00. "Wonder Woman"

Tion Wayne - Green with Envy
 07. "West End" (featuring D-Block Europe)
 12. "Realest One"
 13. "Spend a Bag" (featuring 6lack)
 15. "Homecoming"

Tamera - Afrodite
 01. "Wickedest"
 02. "New Hobby"
 03. "Strong For Me"
 04. "Angel Dust"
 05. "Good Love" (featuring Tay Iwar)

Pa Salieu - Afrikan Rebel
 01. "Shining" (featuring Tay Iwar & Zlatan)

Burna Boy - B.D'or featuring Wizkid - Single
 01. "B.D'or" (featuring Wizkid)

Zhavia Ward - Big Girl$ Don't Cry - Single
 01. "Big Girl$ Don't Cry"

2022
FKA Twigs - Caprisongs
 11. "Jealousy" (featuring Rema) (produced with FRED, El Guincho, FKA Twigs & Koreless)

Young T & Bugsey - Truth Be Told
 02. "Big Bidness"
 04. "Caliente" (featuring Aitch)
 09. "Nice" (featuring Blxst)
 10. "Roberto C" (featuring Unknown T)
 11. "Glitter Ain't Gold"

Ella Mai - Heart on My Sleeve
 "Fallen Angel" (produced with Meko yohannes, Jahaan Sweet, Gaetan Judd, Mustard & Ari PenSmith)

Burna Boy - Love, Damini
 02. "Science"
 06. "Whiskey"
 10. "Dirty Secrets"
 12. "For My Hand" (featuring Ed Sheeran)

Omah Lay - Boy Alone
 02. "i"
 13. "tell everybody" (featuring Tay Iwar)

Beyoncé - Renaissance
 10. "Move" (produced with Beyoncé, GuiltyBeatz, MeLo-X, The-Dream & Stuart White)

Awards and nominations

References 

1987 births
Living people
21st-century Nigerian musicians
Nigerian songwriters
Nigerian record producers